Carlos Orlando Caballero Sánchez (born 5 December 1958) is a Honduran football midfielder who played for Honduras in the 1982 FIFA World Cup.

Club career
He played for Vida, Real España, Marathón and Real Maya between 1978 and 1993, scoring 34 goals in 275 games.

International career
He played for Honduras in the 1980s and represented his country in 9 FIFA World Cup qualification matches and played in one game at the 1982 FIFA World Cup.

Retirement and managerial career
In the 2009 Clausura season he almost steered Second Division side Social Sol to promotion. He also coached Hispano in 2011.

In June 2010, Caballero was honoured by the Universidad Pedagógica Nacional Francisco Morazán when a new sports facility at the university was named after him. In summer 2013 he left his post at second division Villanueva to become assistant to Hernán Medford at Real España.

References

External links

1958 births
Living people
People from Yoro Department
Association football midfielders
Honduran footballers
Honduras international footballers
1982 FIFA World Cup players
C.D.S. Vida players
Real C.D. España players
C.D. Marathón players
Real Maya players
Liga Nacional de Fútbol Profesional de Honduras players
Honduran football managers
Real C.D. España managers
CONCACAF Championship-winning players